Stämpfli, or Stampfli, can refer to:

People
Carla Stampfli (born 1984), Swiss swimmer and triathlete
Jakob Stämpfli (1820–1879), Swiss politician
Jakob Stämpfli (bass) (1934–2014), Swiss concert singer and vocal teacher
Regula Stämpfli (born 1962), Swiss-born political scientist
Robert Stämpfli (1914–2002), Swiss researcher who developed the sucrose gap technique
Rudolf Stämpfli (born 1955), Swiss graphic arts entrepreneur and publisher
Walther Stampfli (1884–1965), Swiss politician

Companies
Stämpfli (publisher), a Swiss graphic arts company and publisher
Stämpfli Racing Boats, a British-based manufacturer of rowing boats

Other
Stämpfli Express, a 24-seat rowing boat made by Stämpfli Racing Boats

See also